Octavian Dușa (born 24 December 1954) is a Romanian wrestler. He competed in the men's freestyle 68 kg at the 1980 Summer Olympics.

References

1954 births
Living people
Romanian male sport wrestlers
Olympic wrestlers of Romania
Wrestlers at the 1980 Summer Olympics
Place of birth missing (living people)
20th-century Romanian people